The Golden Heart is a Grade II listed public house in Spitalfields in the London Borough of Tower Hamlets, at 110 Commercial Street, London E1 6LZ. It was built in 1936 for Truman's Brewery, and designed by their in-house architect A. E. Sewell. In 2015, Historic England gave it a Grade II listing, saying that "its largely unaltered interior is one of the best surviving examples of Truman’s in-house style of the 1930s, illustrating many facets of an ‘improved’ pub".

References

External links

 Golden Heart, Spitalfields at pubshistory.com

1936 establishments in England
A. E. Sewell buildings
Commercial Street, London
Grade II listed buildings in the London Borough of Tower Hamlets
Grade II listed pubs in London
Pubs in the London Borough of Tower Hamlets
Spitalfields